The Hague Protocol, officially the Protocol to Amend the Convention for the Unification of Certain Rules Relating to International Carriage by Air, is a treaty signed on September 28, 1955, in The Hague. It serves to amend the Warsaw Convention. While officially the Hague Protocol is intended to become a single entity with the Warsaw Convention, it has only been ratified by 137 of the original 152 parties to the Warsaw Convention. The binding version of the treaty is written in French, but certified versions also exist in English and Spanish. The official depository of the treaty is the Government of Poland.



The Warsaw Convention 

The Warsaw Convention was established to create a legal basis for commercial aviation, both cargo and passenger. Specifically, it allowed for the basis of liability to be assigned to air-carriers in the event of an accident.

Purpose 
There were multiple reasons as to why the Hague Protocol was added as a provision to the Warsaw Convention. Firstly, as the original Convention was written in 1929 and with the advance of technology and law the original treaty had to be updated. Secondly, and perhaps more importantly, the Hague Protocol limited the liability that commercial airliners would have to take on in the event of an accident.

References

External links 
The text of the Hague Protocol (as presented to and ratified by the United States Senate)
The parties to both the Warsaw Convention and the Hague Protocol, as reported to Poland and recorded by the ICAO

Aviation agreements
Treaties concluded in 1955
Treaties entered into force in 1963
1955 in the Netherlands
1955 in aviation
Treaties of the Kingdom of Afghanistan
Treaties of Algeria
Treaties of Angola
Treaties of Argentina
Treaties of Australia
Treaties of Austria
Treaties of Azerbaijan
Treaties of the Bahamas
Treaties of Bangladesh
Treaties of Bahrain
Treaties of the Byelorussian Soviet Socialist Republic
Treaties of Belgium
Treaties of the Republic of Dahomey
Treaties of Bosnia and Herzegovina
Treaties of the military dictatorship in Brazil
Treaties of the People's Republic of Bulgaria
Treaties of Cambodia
Treaties of Cameroon
Treaties of Canada
Treaties of Cape Verde
Treaties of Chile
Treaties of the People's Republic of China
Treaties of Colombia
Treaties of the Republic of the Congo
Treaties of Costa Rica
Treaties of Ivory Coast
Treaties of Croatia
Treaties of Cuba
Treaties of Cyprus
Treaties of the Czech Republic
Treaties of North Korea
Treaties of Denmark
Treaties of the Dominican Republic
Treaties of Ecuador
Treaties of the United Arab Republic
Treaties of El Salvador
Treaties of Estonia
Treaties of Fiji
Treaties of Finland
Treaties of France
Treaties of Gabon
Treaties of West Germany
Treaties of Ghana
Treaties of the Kingdom of Greece
Treaties of Grenada
Treaties of Guatemala
Treaties of Guinea
Treaties of the Hungarian People's Republic
Treaties of Iceland
Treaties of India
Treaties of Pahlavi Iran
Treaties of Ba'athist Iraq
Treaties of Ireland
Treaties of Israel
Treaties of Italy
Treaties of Japan
Treaties of Jordan
Treaties of Kazakhstan
Treaties of Kenya
Treaties of Kuwait
Treaties of the Kingdom of Laos
Treaties of Latvia
Treaties of Lebanon
Treaties of Lesotho
Treaties of the Kingdom of Libya
Treaties of Liechtenstein
Treaties of Lithuania
Treaties of Luxembourg
Treaties of Madagascar
Treaties of Malawi
Treaties of Malaysia
Treaties of the Maldives
Treaties of Mali
Treaties of Mauritius
Treaties of Mexico
Treaties of Monaco
Treaties of Montenegro
Treaties of Morocco
Treaties of Nauru
Treaties of Nepal
Treaties of the Netherlands
Treaties of New Zealand
Treaties of Niger
Treaties of Nigeria
Treaties of Norway
Treaties of Oman
Treaties of Pakistan
Treaties of Panama
Treaties of Papua New Guinea
Treaties of Paraguay
Treaties of Peru
Treaties of the Philippines
Treaties of the Polish People's Republic
Treaties of the Estado Novo (Portugal)
Treaties of Qatar
Treaties of South Korea
Treaties of Moldova
Treaties of the Socialist Republic of Romania
Treaties of the Soviet Union
Treaties of Rwanda
Treaties of Saint Vincent and the Grenadines
Treaties of Samoa
Treaties of Saudi Arabia
Treaties of Senegal
Treaties of Serbia and Montenegro
Treaties of Seychelles
Treaties of Singapore
Treaties of Slovakia
Treaties of Slovenia
Treaties of the Solomon Islands
Treaties of South Africa
Treaties of Francoist Spain
Treaties of Sri Lanka
Treaties of the Democratic Republic of the Sudan
Treaties of Suriname
Treaties of Eswatini
Treaties of Switzerland
Treaties of Sweden
Treaties of Syria
Treaties of North Macedonia
Treaties of Togo
Treaties of Tonga
Treaties of Trinidad and Tobago
Treaties of Tunisia
Treaties of Turkey
Treaties of the Ukrainian Soviet Socialist Republic
Treaties of the United Arab Emirates
Treaties of the United Kingdom
Treaties of the United States
Treaties of Uzbekistan
Treaties of Vanuatu
Treaties of Venezuela
Treaties of Vietnam
Treaties of Zambia
Treaties of Zimbabwe
Treaties of Czechoslovakia
Treaties of East Germany
Treaties of Yugoslavia
Treaties extended to the Territory of Papua and New Guinea
Treaties extended to Norfolk Island
Treaties extended to the Nauru Trust Territory
Treaties extended to Greenland
Treaties extended to the Faroe Islands
Treaties extended to Portuguese Macau
Treaties extended to the British Solomon Islands
Treaties extended to British Hong Kong
Treaties extended to Bermuda
Treaties extended to the British Antarctic Territory
Treaties extended to the Cayman Islands
Treaties extended to the Turks and Caicos Islands
Treaties extended to the Falkland Islands
Treaties extended to South Georgia and the South Sandwich Islands
Treaties extended to Montserrat
Treaties extended to Saint Helena, Ascension and Tristan da Cunha